Richard Flores Taitano known as Dick Taitano (May 14, 1921 - January 4, 1997) was a Democratic Party of Guam politician in Guam. Taitano served as a senator for six terms of the Guam Legislature.

Early life

Taitano graduated from George Washington High School in 1940 and earned a Baccalaureate degree from Berea College in 1949.

Professional life
Taitano was appointed Director of the Guam Department of Finance and served from 1952 to 1961. Taitano was appointed by President John F. Kennedy to serve as Director of the Office of the Territories and served from 1961 to 1964. Taitano was appointed by President Lyndon Johnson to serve as Deputy High Commissioner for the Trust Territory of the Pacific Islands and he served from 1964 to 1966.

Guam Legislature
Taitano first successfully ran as a senator in the Guam Legislature in 1966 and was reelected in 1968. Following his unsuccessful bid for Lieutenant in 1970 with Ricardo J. Bordallo, Taitano ran and was elected to four consecutive terms following his return to the legislature in the 1972 election.

Elections

Bordallo-Taitano 1970 Gubernatorial Ticket
Ricardo Bordallo ran for Governor with Taitano as his Lieutenant Governor candidate in the 1970 Guam gubernatorial election. After winning the primary election, the ticket was defeated in against the incumbent Republican Governor and Lieutenant Governor, Carlos Camacho and Kurt Moylan.

Personal life 

Legacy
The Micronesian Area Research Center was named for Richard F. Taitano in 1997.

References

1921 births
1997 deaths
20th-century American politicians
Chamorro people
Guamanian Democrats
Members of the Legislature of Guam